INT 10h, INT 10H or INT 16 is shorthand for BIOS interrupt call 10hex, the 17th interrupt vector in an x86-based computer system. The BIOS typically sets up a real mode interrupt handler at this vector that provides video services. Such services include setting the video mode, character and string output, and graphics primitives (reading and writing pixels in graphics mode).

To use this call, load AH with the number of the desired subfunction, load other required parameters in other registers, and make the call. INT 10h is fairly slow, so many programs bypass this BIOS routine and access the display hardware directly. Setting the video mode, which is done infrequently, can be accomplished by using the BIOS, while drawing graphics on the screen in a game needs to be done quickly, so direct access to video RAM is more appropriate than making a BIOS call for every pixel.

Furthermore, on a modern x86 system, BIOS calls can only be performed in Real mode, or Virtual 8086 mode. v8086 is not an option in Long mode. This means that a modern operating system, which operates in Protected mode (32 bit), or Long mode (64 bit), would need to switch into real mode and back to call the BIOS - a hugely expensive operation. Although most modern systems typically use device drivers that directly set the video mode, it is not feasible for hobbyist systems to have a device driver for every video card - a problem that also plagues older, unsupported systems such as Windows 98. Such systems instead can drop into Real mode to switch the video mode, then draw to the framebuffer directly.

In EFI 1.x systems, the INT 10H and the VESA BIOS Extensions (VBE) are replaced by the EFI UGA protocol. In widely used UEFI 2.x systems, the INT 10H and the VBE are replaced by the UEFI GOP.

List of supported functions
The list is incomplete; use Ralf Brown's list for comprehensive information. Please only add IBM/PC or other common standard functions. 00h through 0fh are CGA.

See also
 BIOS interrupt call
 Mode 13h
 VESA BIOS Extensions
 Ralf Brown's Interrupt List

References

 INT 10h from Ralf Brown's Interrupt List, online version
 INT 10h on www.ousob.com

BIOS
Interrupts